In Greek mythology, Leucippus (Ancient Greek: Λεύκιππος Leukippos) was a Messenian prince. The Boeotian town of Leuctra is said to have derived its name from him.

Family 
Leucippus was the son of Gorgophone and Perieres and brother of Aphareus. He was the father of  two Leucippides: Phoebe and Hilaera, and also of Arsinoe, mother of Asclepius and Eriopis begotten by the god Apollo. These three daughters were borne by his wife Philodice, daughter of Inachus.

Mythology 
It is said that Leucippus together with his brother Aphareus inherited their father's kingdom upon his death, but the latter kept the greater authority than the former.

Castor and Polydeuces abducted and married Leucippus' daughters, Phoebe and Hilaera. In return, Idas and Lynceus, nephews of Leucippus and rival suitors, killed Castor. Polydeuces was granted immortality by Zeus, and further persuaded Zeus to share his gift with Castor.

Notes

References 
 Apollodorus, The Library with an English Translation by Sir James George Frazer, F.B.A., F.R.S. in 2 Volumes, Cambridge, MA, Harvard University Press; London, William Heinemann Ltd. 1921. ISBN 0-674-99135-4. Online version at the Perseus Digital Library. Greek text available from the same website.
Harry Thurston Peck. Harpers Dictionary of Classical Antiquities (1898) s.v. Leucippus. New York. Harper and Brothers. 1898.
 Hesiod, Catalogue of Women from Homeric Hymns, Epic Cycle, Homerica translated by Evelyn-White, H G. Loeb Classical Library Volume 57. London: William Heinemann, 1914. Online version at theio.com
 Pausanias, Description of Greece with an English Translation by W.H.S. Jones, Litt.D., and H.A. Ormerod, M.A., in 4 Volumes. Cambridge, MA, Harvard University Press; London, William Heinemann Ltd. 1918. . Online version at the Perseus Digital Library
Pausanias, Graeciae Descriptio. 3 vols. Leipzig, Teubner. 1903.  Greek text available at the Perseus Digital Library.
 Publius Ovidius Naso, Metamorphoses translated by Brookes More (1859-1942). Boston, Cornhill Publishing Co. 1922. Online version at the Perseus Digital Library.
 Publius Ovidius Naso, Metamorphoses. Hugo Magnus. Gotha (Germany). Friedr. Andr. Perthes. 1892. Latin text available at the Perseus Digital Library.
Sextus Propertius, Elegies from Charm. Vincent Katz. trans. Los Angeles. Sun & Moon Press. 1995. Online version at the Perseus Digital Library. Latin text available at the same website.
William Smith. A Dictionary of Greek and Roman biography and mythology s.v. Leucippus. London. John Murray (1848).

Princes in Greek mythology

Messenian characters in Greek mythology